Joséphine is a 2013 French romantic comedy film directed by Agnès Obadia. The story is adapted from the French comic of the same name by Pénélope Bagieu. A sequel, Joséphine s'arrondit, was released on 10 February 2016.

Plot
30-year-old Joséphine is single, lives with her cat Brad Pitt and is looking for the man of her dreams. During a family meal, her younger sister, Diane, who seems perfect in every way, announces her future marriage: this is the straw that breaks the camel's back for Joséphine, who has not got a man in her life. Jealous, she claims she is marrying Marcelo, a Brazilian surgeon, and will live with him in his country. Joséphine's lies then start to spiral, producing life-changing outcomes.

Alexandra, the head of her company's human resources, overhears a conversation between Joséphine and her friend Chloe and, having been hired to drive a wave of layoffs, jumps at the chance to fire Joséphine. Joséphine's friends buy her a plane ticket to Brazil. Just before the plane's departure, Joséphine suffers a panic attack and is taken to the hospital, unbeknownst to her friends and family, whilst her luggage is misplaced.

Joséphine chooses to continue the deception and decides to hide in her own apartment, which was temporarily loaned by Chloe to their colleague, Gilles. Despite previously finding him tedious and boring, Joséphine gradually falls for him.

The deceit is discovered by Gilles when Joséphine's bag is returned to her apartment. He calls her friends and when Joséphine returns, he confronts her about the lies. Joséphine, through false tears, then claims she came back after Marcelo's death, but Gilles and her friends don't believe the story and leave angrily.

Joséphine confesses her love to Gilles but he refuses to forgive her deception. Joséphine, trying to make a fresh start, decides to interrupt her sister's wedding after discovering that her fiance, Aymeric, cheated. Diane chooses to believe her and they flee the church together.

Meanwhile, Gilles, deciding to forgive Joséphine, goes to her apartment. The door is answered by Julien, an ex-boyfriend of Joséphine, who is staying with Joséphine after being thrown out by his wife. Gilles, assuming Julien and Joséphine are in a relationship, leaves disappointed. When Joséphine learns from Julien about Gilles' visit, she catches up with him in order to convince him of her love. During the credits, it is shown that Joséphine's friends have forgiven her for her lies, and she and Gilles have moved in together.

Cast

 Marilou Berry as Joséphine
 Mehdi Nebbou as Gilles
 Bérengère Krief as Chloé
 Amelle Chahbi as Rose
 Charlie Dupont as Julien
 Alice Pol as Diane
 Bruno Podalydès as the psychologist
 Arben Bajraktaraj as the carney
 Philippe Pollet-Villard as the monk
 Olivier Cruveiller as Joséphine's father
 Françoise Miquelis as Joséphine's mother
 Claudine Baschet as Mamita
 Cyril Guei as Cyril
 Caroline Anglade as Alexandra
 Valentin Merlet as Aymeric
 Edson Rodrigues as Marcelo

Sequel
A sequel was announced after the success of the film in France, to be directed by Marilou Berry who also stars in the lead role. Joséphine s'arrondit follows the adventures of a slightly older and pregnant Joséphine, who finally found her "perfect man". It was screened on 15 January 2016 at the Festival International du Film de l'Alpe d'Huez ("International Festival of film of l'Alpe d'Huez") before its general release on 10 February 2016.

References

External links
 

2013 romantic comedy films
2013 films
Films based on French comics
French romantic comedy films
Live-action films based on comics
2010s French films
2010s French-language films